Julio César Castillo Torres (born 10 May 1988) is an Ecuadorian amateur boxer. He won two medals at the Pan American Games: a bronze in 2007 and a silver in 2011.

Career
At the 2006 South American Games, Castillo lost to Hamilton Ventura in the semifinals and ended up with a bronze medal. At the 2007 Pan American Games, he won 15:5 against Carlos Negron, but lost to the eventual winner Eleider Alvarez 8:10 in the semifinal. He failed to qualify for the 2008 Summer Olympics and went up to heavyweight, winning a silver at the 2011 Pan American Games. 

At the 2012 Olympic qualifier, he lost 8:14 to Michael Hunter, but qualified for the Olympics on the strength of "two wins vs no-names". He lost in the first bout at both the 2012 and 2016 Olympics.

He represented Ecuador at the 2020 Summer Olympics.

References

External links

 
 
 
 PanAms 2007

1988 births
Living people
People from Durán, Ecuador
Ecuadorian male boxers
Light-heavyweight boxers
Olympic boxers of Ecuador
Boxers at the 2012 Summer Olympics
Boxers at the 2016 Summer Olympics
Pan American Games bronze medalists for Ecuador
Pan American Games silver medalists for Ecuador
Pan American Games medalists in boxing
Boxers at the 2007 Pan American Games
Boxers at the 2011 Pan American Games
Boxers at the 2015 Pan American Games
Boxers at the 2019 Pan American Games
South American Games gold medalists for Ecuador
South American Games bronze medalists for Ecuador
South American Games silver medalists for Ecuador
South American Games medalists in boxing
Competitors at the 2006 South American Games
Competitors at the 2010 South American Games
Competitors at the 2018 South American Games
AIBA World Boxing Championships medalists
Heavyweight boxers
Medalists at the 2007 Pan American Games
Medalists at the 2011 Pan American Games
Medalists at the 2019 Pan American Games
Boxers at the 2020 Summer Olympics
21st-century Ecuadorian people